There Is Nothing Else is the debut studio album by Uncle John & Whitelock. It was released in 2006 on CD and gatefold double LP and incorporates material recorded at Redchurch Recordings in London between 2003 and 2005 and material recorded at CaVa Studios in Glasgow in 2005. Included on the album are the singles The Train and 2 - Fiddy.

Critical reception for the album was favourable, it receiving a number of positive reviews, including a five star review in the Sunday Herald. In 2009, the album placed at number 18 in The Skinny's Scottish Albums of the Decade, described as a 'strange and singular work in the canon of Scottish rock'. The album cover, designed by Raydale Dower, is inspired by the cover of Konx om Pax by Aleister Crowley, who also gives track 7 on the album its title.

Track listing

Personnel
Jacob Lovatt – guitar, vocals
Raydale Dower – bass
Matthew Black – drums
David Philp - guitar on all tracks except Black Hat, 2-Fiddy, Whalin' and The Train
Jamie Bolland - Keyboards on all tracks except 2-Fiddy and The Train
Andrew Hobson – guitar on Black Hat, 2-Fiddy, Whalin' and The Train
Nic Denholm – keyboards on 2-Fiddy and The Train
Engineers: Frederick Baggs and Geoff Allan
Recorded at: Redchurch Recordings, London, England (tracks 1-8, 13, 16, 18-21) and CaVa Studios, Glasgow, Scotland (tracks 9-12, 14, 15, 17).
Mastered at: CaVa Studios, Glasgow, Scotland
Cover design: Raydale Dower and Jacob Lovatt
Photography (inner sleeve): Alan Dimmick and Benji de Burca 
Typesetting: Robert Johnston

External links
Uncle John and Whitelock on Myspace

References 

2006 debut albums